Charles J. Dougherty (born June 28, 1949) is an American academic who served as the 12th president of Duquesne University in Pittsburgh, Pennsylvania. An expert in the field of health care ethics, Dougherty has published two books on the subject.

Academic career
The first member of his family to attend college, Dougherty received his bachelor's degree in philosophy from St. Bonaventure University in 1971. He went on to earn a master's degree and doctorate in the same subject from the University of Notre Dame in 1973 and 1975.

Academic Vice President of Creighton University

Dougherty joined the faculty of Creighton University in 1975, chairing the philosophy department there from 1981 to 1989. He served as the first director of the Creighton Center for Health Policy and Ethics from 1988 to 1995, a position which he left when he was appointed the university's academic vice president. He held that post from 1995 to 2001, during which time he was acting university president for a brief period in 2000.

President of Duquesne University

Dougherty was elected president of Duquesne University by its board of directors in May 2001. During Dougherty's tenure, Duquesne underwent $350 million in building construction, including the Power Center, a fitness facility which also houses the campus's bookstore and two restaurants, and Des Places Hall, an upperclassman residence hall. In the fall of 2012, Duquesne welcomed its largest freshman class in history, a record again topped the following year. Duquesne was listed as one of the top twenty most efficient national universities by U.S. News; Duquesne was the only Pennsylvania school as well as the only Catholic school on the list.

On February 13, 2015, just two days after the death of his predecessor John E. Murray, Jr., Dougherty announced he would step down as President effective at the end of his third term. On November 4, 2015, Duquesne University named Law School Dean Ken Gormley as Dougherty's successor, effective July 1, 2016.

Community involvement
Dougherty has worked with the Hospital Trustees Project at the Hastings Center and the New York Academy of Medicine, as well as the National Coalition on Catholic Health Care. He has served on the board of trustees of the Catholic Health Association and the Board of Editors at both Creighton University Press and Health Progress. Dougherty has also served as a Commissioner for the State of Nebraska Accountability and Disclosure Commission, a government ethics panel. He is a member of the Board of Directors of Mercy Hospital; Mercy Health Systems in Pittsburgh, Pennsylvania; Allegheny Conference on Community Development; Pittsburgh Downtown Partnership; World Affairs Council of Pittsburgh; and the Urban League of Pittsburgh. He serves on the board of the Association of Independent Colleges and Universities of Pennsylvania and is the Chair of the President's Committee of the Pittsburgh Council on Higher Education.

Personal life
Charles Dougherty was born in Brooklyn, New York and attended St. Anthony's High School in Smithtown, New York. Dougherty and his wife, Sandra, who recently retired as a judge on the Nebraska District Court in Douglas County, have two children.

References

1949 births
Living people
Presidents of Duquesne University
People from Brooklyn
St. Bonaventure University alumni
Notre Dame College of Arts and Letters alumni
Catholics from New York (state)